Ertuğrul Ergezen (born 20 July 1978) is a boxer from Turkey who participated in the 2004 Summer Olympics. There he was disqualified against Wilmer Vasquez in the first round of the Heavyweight (91 kg) division.

Amateur
Ergezen won the bronze medal in the same division six months earlier, at the 2004 European Amateur Boxing Championships in Pula, Croatia.

Pro
Ergezen won four fights in 2005 then retired.

External links
Yahoo! Sports

1978 births
Living people
Heavyweight boxers
Boxers at the 2004 Summer Olympics
Olympic boxers of Turkey
Turkish male boxers
21st-century Turkish people